Weyrauchia is a genus of beetles in the family Cerambycidae, containing the following species:

 Weyrauchia aeruginosa Monne, 2004
 Weyrauchia marcelae Martins & Galileo, 2008
 Weyrauchia marinezae Martins & Galileo, 2008
 Weyrauchia nobilis Tippmann, 1960
 Weyrauchia viridimicans Tippmann, 1953

References

Trachyderini
Cerambycidae genera